The 24th Men's European Volleyball Championship was the first continental volleyball competition hosted by two nations – Serbia and Montenegro and Italy, namely in their respective capitals, Belgrade and Rome. Championship took place from September 2 to September 11, 2005.

Qualification

Teams
Preliminary competitions consisted of two groups with six teams each, based in Rome and Belgrade, with first two teams from each groups progressing to semi-finals.

Group A – Rome (PalaLottomatica)
 
 
 
 
 

Group B – Belgrade (Belgrade Arena)

Preliminary round

 All times are Central European Summer Time (UTC+02:00).

Pool A
venue: PalaLottomatica, Rome, Italy

|}

Pool B
venue: Belgrade Arena, Belgrade, Serbia and Montenegro

|}

Final round
venue: PalaLottomatica, Rome, Italy
 All times are Central European Summer Time (UTC+02:00).

Semifinals

Final

Final ranking

Team Roster
Matej Černič, Alberto Cisolla, Mirko Corsano, Paolo Cozzi, Alessandro Fei, Michal Lasko, Luigi Mastrangelo, Alessandro Paparoni, Cristian Savani, Giacomo Sintini, Luca Tencati, and Valerio Vermiglio.Head coach: Gian Paolo Montali.

Individual awards
MVP: 
Best Server: 
Best Libero: 
Best Setter: 
Best Spiker: 
Best Blocker: 
Best Receiver:

References
 CEV Results

Men's European Volleyball Championships
E
International sports competitions in Belgrade
VEC 2005 Men

European Volleyball Championship
European Volleyball Championship
International volleyball competitions hosted by Serbia
2005 in Italian sport
2005 in Serbian sport
2000s in Belgrade
2000s in Rome
Sports competitions in Rome
September 2005 sports events in Europe
2005 in Serbia and Montenegro